Freelancers is a 2012 American action film directed by Jessy Terrero, written by L.Philippe Casseus and stars 50 Cent, Forest Whitaker, and Robert De Niro.  It had a limited release in very few in Los Angeles and New York on August 10, 2012 with a simultaneous VOD release and was released on DVD and Blu-ray on August 21, 2012.

Plot 
With his two best friends, Jonas Maldonado, the son of a slain NYPD officer, joins the police academy. After graduating, he's taken under the wing of his father's former partner, Captain Joe Sarcone, who invites him to join the Street Vice Crime Task Force. Under Sarcone's tutelage, he becomes part of a rogue task force that consists of dirty cops. After he learns from the District Attorney's office that his father was murdered by Sarcone after turning state's evidence, Maldonado frames Sarcone for a theft from powerful mob boss Gabriel Baez. Baez orders Maldonado to kill one of his friends as a sign of loyalty, which he reluctantly does. With Baez's help, Maldonado then kills the dirty cops responsible for his father's death. At the end, the Drug Enforcement Agency approaches Maldonado, urges him not to take Sarcone's place as Baez's right-hand man, and Maldonado ponders whether to go straight or not.

Cast 
 50 Cent as Jonas "Malo" Maldonado
 Forest Whitaker as Lieutenant Dennis Lureu
 Robert De Niro as Captain Joe Sarcone
 Matt Gerald as Billy Morrison
 Beau Garrett as Joey
 Malcolm Goodwin as A.D. Valburn
 Ryan O'Nan as Lucas
 Robert Wisdom as Terrence Burke
 Dana Delany as Lydia Vecchio
 Vinnie Jones as Sully
 Pedro Armendariz Jr. as Gabriel Baez
 Michael McGrady as Robert Jude
 Andre Royo as Daniel Maldonado
 Jeff Chase as Angie
 Jesse Pruett as Mercer Bartender
 Anabelle Acosta as Cyn

Production 
In February 2011, Variety announced that 50 Cent will play a lead role in the film. He will star as the "son of a slain NYPD officer who joins the force and welcomed by his father’s former partner into the ranks of his vice crime task force — and on to a team of rogue Gotham cops." A month later, Deadline reported that Robert De Niro and Forest Whitaker had joined the film. Variety announced in May of that year that Dana Delany would play a lead female role.  50 Cent said that he felt compassion for his character despite the character's ambiguous morality. That and other aspects of the film that he could identify with from his own experiences drew him to the project.

Release 
Freelancers had a limited release on August 10, 2012, and was released on home video on August 21, 2012.  It was number six in the top ten DVD and Blu-ray rentals in the week of August 30, 2012.

Reception 
The film received generally negative reviews from critics. R. L. Shaffer of IGN rated it 3/10 and wrote, "Freelancers is a dull, lifeless cop drama built on cliches, powered by throwaway supporting performances from Forest Whitaker and Robert De Niro."  William Harrison of DVD Talk rated it 1.5/5 and wrote, "Freelancers gives its audience nothing it hasn't seen a hundred times before in better cop dramas. This tale of corruption and retaliation is predictable and largely uninteresting, and actors 50 Cent, Robert De Niro and Forest Whitaker do little more than go through the motions."  Gordon Sullivan of DVD Verdict called it a derivative and forgettable cop drama with a good cast.

References

External links 
 
 

2012 films
2012 crime action films
2010s police films
American crime action films
Films about the New York City Police Department
Films about police corruption
Films set in New York City
Films shot in New Orleans
Lionsgate films
MoviePass Films films
Films directed by Jessy Terrero
2010s English-language films
2010s American films